Darko Domijan (5 February 1952 – 2016) was a Croatian pop singer who was most popular in the 1970s and 1980s. His best known songs include "Ulica jorgovana", "Jelena Je Bila Lijepa", "Ruže u snijegu" and "Sedam suza", the latter two being Croatian-language covers of "Sun of Jamaica" and "Seven Tears", respectively, by Goombay Dance Band.

Since his retirement from music in 1989, Domijan has been working as an attorney in Zagreb.

Discography

Releases:
 "Laku noć, Katarina" / "Je l' istina ono što govore o tebi" (7", Single), Jugoton, 1974
 "Julske Kiše" / "Ljetnje Noći" (7", Single), Jugoton, 1977
 Darko Domijan, 1980
 Ruže u snijegu, 1983
 Sve Najbolje, 2001

Tracks Appear On:
 Festival Zabavne Glazbe Split (2xLP, Comp) with:  "Moja Romantika", Jugoton, 1981
 Slavonija '81 (LP, Album) with:  "Zapjevala Slavonija Naša",  Jugoton, 1981
 Split '82 with "Mirišu ti kose", 1982
 ZagrebFest 82 (LP, Comp) with 	"O, Nela", Jugoton, 1982
 Split 83 with: "Anči", 1983
 Split 84 with: "Nikad više", 1984
 Hitovi Hitovi (Zagreb Fest '85) (Cass, Comp) with "Zlato Moje", Jugoton, 1985
 Split 85 with: "Zadnja noć" , 1985
 Split 86 with: "Što bi bilo, kad bi bilo"
 Zvuk osamdesetih Zabavna i Pop 1982 – 1983 with: "Sedam suza", 2002
 Koprivnica 2004. with: "Ti samo..." , 2004
 Retromanija Osamdesetih (2xCD) with:  "Ulica Jorgovana", City Records (2), 2006
 Đorđe Novković – Gold collection, 2007

References

Sources 
 Diskografija on Darko Domijan
 Discogs  on Darko Domijan

1952 births
Living people
People from Karlovac
20th-century Croatian male singers
Croatian pop singers